is a Japanese singer, actress, voice actress and choreographer. She is a member of StylipS, a former member of Ongaku Gatas and was part of Hello! Project.

Career

Noto joined Hello! Project in June 2004 and became part of the group's trainee program, Hello Pro Egg. During this time, she participated as a member of Ongaku Gatas. She graduated from the company on September 23, 2009.

Filmography

Television animation
2010
Kaitō Reinya, Policewoman Notti

2012
La storia della Arcana Famiglia, Woman 1 (ep 7)
Nakaimo - My Sister Is Among Them!, Maiko Kotori
Saki Achiga-hen episode of Side-A, Sera Eguchi
High School DxD, Issei's alarm clock, Nii (ep 11)

2013
Shirokuma Cafe, Porcupine fan club
The Severing Crime Edge, Nigi Ubuzato

2014
The Comic Artist and Assistants, Mihari Otosuna 
Locodol (ep 3)

OVA
Sankarea: Undying Love (2012), Onozawa
Nakaimo - My Sister Is Among Them! (2013), Maiko Kotori
The Comic Artist and Assistants (2014), Mihari Otosuna

ONA
Kyō no Asuka Show (2012), Asuka Kyōno

Movies
 Light Novel no Tanoshii Kakikata (2010), Kokona Atae

Video games
Sorcery Saga: Curse of the Great Curry God (2013), Cliora
Makai Shin Trillion (2015), Lilith
Fairy Fencer F (2013), Cui
Fairy Fencer F: Advent Dark Force (2015), Cui
Fairy Fencer F: Refrain Chord (2022), Cui

Songs
"Blue Moon Dream"

References

External links
Official blog 

1988 births
Living people
Voice actresses from Chiba Prefecture
Japanese video game actresses
Japanese voice actresses
Musicians from Chiba Prefecture
StylipS members
21st-century Japanese women singers
21st-century Japanese singers